Kenshin-ryū is a style of Okinawan kobudō that focuses on the use of the bō staff that is taught as a complementary style to Shito-ryū karate.  As a supplementary style, it is known across the Japan, the US and Europe.  One of its primary teachers is Akio Minakami.

In theory, Kenshin-ryū was the "peasants' art", and consists of several blocks, strikes, thrusts, and evasions.

It is, however, an effective and powerful style that provides good basics and kihon that are easily absorbed into further kobudō training with other styles.

Basic Techniques

Uncategorized
 Kiti-kai k'osh (sweep from left to right, upward snap to jaw, overhead downward strike)
 270 degree spin to the left
 Upward push

Sweeps
 Back leg sweep
 Hooking leg sweep - stepping forward
 Hooking leg sweep - stepping backward

Thrusts
 Forward thrust
 Sidestep thrust forward
 Crouched side thrust
 Downward back thrust

Blocks
 Push block - forward
 Push block - downward
 Spinning downward block

Strikes
 Spinning strike to the head
 Overhead sword strike - forward
 Overhead pulling strike  - any direction may be used.  In kata, 90 degrees right or 45 degrees left
 Collarbone strike/crush, stepping forward
 Collarbone strike/crush, stepping backward
 Snap strike, right to left

Fundamentals

Basic posture is a high front stance, right leg forward, with the hips rotated to face forward.  The bo is held in three equal portions, with the left hand at the hip and the bo pointing at the opponent's throat.  Forward strikes are either executed from the shoulder or above the head (kendo style), with the bo either being stopped with the left hand at the hip or with the staff tucked into the left armpit.

This is substantially different from most other bo styles as normally the body is turned to the side, presenting a narrow target to the opponent.  Direction changes are typically done by dropping the center of gravity while also opening the hips while stepping.  Also, in some instances a 270 degree spin is employed that also includes a retreating step, or a simple step/step technique where the feet come together briefly and the body rotates to the desired direction before resuming the desired stance.

Power is developed in most techniques by utilizing the rear leg and minimal hip rotation in combination with upper body torsion.  Beginning students typically either use extremity strength only or exaggerate the leg push/hip rotation.  This is rectified easily by repetition training and attacking a weighted target to train for timing.  There are some thrusts and strikes that generate power from the rotation of the shoulders from a leading to a trailing position - these are most pronounced in Kubo no koan, and typically only performed properly by advanced students.

Most of the strikes are pushed out by the upper body and generally don't generate much obvious speed due to the short distances traveled.  The exception to this is found toward the end of Kubo no koan, which utilizes a long pulling motion to execute a blow to the head - this is similar to Yammani-ryū.

Kata
There are five (5), kata in the syllabus, though only the first three are generally taught outside Japan.  There are minor variations in kata between schools that commonly teach it.

 Shodan no koan
 Nidan no koan
 Kubo no koan
 Sanbon no koan
 (Sakugawa No Kon) 5th kata

Shitō-ryū
Okinawan kobudo